In geometric optics, stigmatism refers to the image-formation property of an optical system which focuses a single point source in object space into a single point in image space.  Two such points are called a stigmatic pair of the optical system. Many optical systems, even those exhibiting optical aberrations including astigmatism, have at least one stigmatic pair. Stigmatism is applicable only in the approximation provided by geometric optics. In reality, image formation is at best diffraction limited and point-like images are not possible.

References

 

Geometrical optics